Máximo Berrondo (born 1927) is an Argentinian actor, screenwriter and film director.

Selected filmography
 The Path to Crime (1951)

References

Bibliography 
 Martín, Jorge Abel. Cine argentino. Ediciones Corregidor, 1983.

External links 
 

1927 births
Possibly living people
Argentine film directors
Argentine male film actors
Argentine screenwriters
Male screenwriters
Argentine male writers